Nattandiya is a town, situated in the Puttalam District, of North Western Province, Sri Lanka.

References

Towns in Puttalam District